Events from the year 1720 in art.

Events
May 2 – James Thornhill, Serjeant Painter to King George I of Great Britain, is knighted, the first native English artist to be so honoured.
John Michael Rysbrack settles in London.
Portraitist Rosalba Carriera moves temporarily from Venice to Paris.
The interior decoration of Santo Sepolcro (Pisa) is restored.

Works

 Rosalba Carriera – Maria Josepha of Austria
 Peter Scheemakers – Bust of John Dryden (Westminster Abbey)
 Antoine Watteau
The Judgement of Paris (approximate date)
The shop sign of Gersaint

Births
January 19 – John Boydell, engraver (died 1804)
January 20 – Bernardo Bellotto, Italian urban landscape painter or vedutista, and printmaker in etching (died 1780)
August 15 – Charles Norbert Roettiers, French engraver and medallist (died 1772)
October 4 – Giovanni Battista Piranesi, Italian artist (died 1778)
November 30 – André Soares, Portuguese sculptor and architect (died 1769)
date unknown
Pierre-Edmé Babel, French engraver (died 1775)
John Giles Eccardt, German-born English portrait painter (died 1779)
Charles-Dominique-Joseph Eisen, French painter and draftsman (died 1778)
Edme Dumont, French sculptor (died 1775)
Pietro Gaspari, Italian artist, known for veduta and capriccio in etchings and paintings (died 1785)
Carlo Magini, Italian painter of the Baroque period (died 1806)
Johannes Rach, Danish painter and draughtsman (died 1783)
Giuseppe Sanmartino, Italian sculptor during the Rococo period (died 1793)
Isak Wacklin, Finnish painter (died 1758)
 Georg Caspar von Prenner, Austrian artist (died 1766), son of Anton Joseph von Prenner, Austrian artist (1683/98?–1761)
 date probably
Anton Giuseppe Barbazza, Italian painter and engraver of the Baroque period (died 1771)
Jonas Haas, German-born Danish engraver (died 1775)

Deaths
March 6 – Pieter van Bloemen, Flemish painter (born 1657)
June 3 – Cristoforo Munari, Italian painter specializing in still life (born 1667)
October 10 – Antoine Coysevox, French sculptor emigrated from Spain (born 1640)
November 19 - Hendrick van Streeck, Dutch Golden Age painter of church interiors and a sculptor (born 1659)
date unknown
Giovanni Agostino Cassana, Italian painter of animals and subject pictures (born 1658)
Orazio Marinali, Italian sculptor, active mainly in Veneto (born 1643)
Tao Chi,  Chinese landscape painter (born 1641)
Adriaen van Salm, Dutch draftsman and painter (born 1660)
probable
Alberto Carlieri, Italian painter of the late-Baroque period (born 1672)

References

 
Years of the 18th century in art
1720s in art